Hans Mathias Theodor Jacob Madsen (January 14, 1858 – November 5, 1935) was a Norwegian writer.

Madsen debuted with the novel I Drift (In Operation) in 1890. Most of his works are written in the Naturalist style. Madsen was the father of the sculptor Sofus Madsen and the brother of the opera singer Ina Madsen.

Works
 I drift (In Operation, novel), 1890
 Guds finger (The Finger of God, novel), 1893
 Marionetter (Puppets, play), 1895
 Under kundskabens træ (Under the Tree of Knowledge, novel), 1897
 Per Gadd (play), 1915

References

1858 births
1935 deaths
Norwegian novelists
Norwegian dramatists and playwrights